This article covers records concerning the shortest-ever tennis matches both in terms of number of games and duration in terms of time. Matches affected by a retirement or default are not listed.

Short times

Men

Overall
 Jack Harper lost just one point when he defeated J. Sandiford 6–0, 6–0 at the 1946 Surrey Open Hard Court Championships in a match that lasted 18 minutes, the shortest men's singles match on record.
Francisco Clavet set an ATP tournament record in Shanghai in the first round of the 2001 Heineken Open Shanghai when he defeated Jiang Shan (Li Na's husband) in 25 minutes, 6–0, 6–0.

Grand Slam tournaments

Wimbledon
The 1881 Wimbledon final in which William Renshaw defeated John Hartley, 6–0, 6–1, 6–1, lasted 36 minutes.
Fred Perry defeated Gottfried von Cramm, 6–1, 6–1, 6–0, in the 1936 Wimbledon final in 40 minutes.
Jo-Wilfried Tsonga defeated Bernard Tomic in the first round in the 2019 Wimbledon Championships 6–2, 6–1, 6–4 in 58 minutes, though Tomic was later fined for a lack of effort.

Masters Tour

Jarkko Nieminen won against Bernard Tomic at the Miami Masters in 2014 in 28 minutes, 6–0, 6–1.

Olympics
John Millman became the first player in Olympic tennis history to win a match by the scoreline of 6–0, 6–0 when he defeated Ričardas Berankis in the first round of the tennis tournament at the 2016 Summer Olympics.

Women

Overall
Margaret Court won the 1963 Eastern Grass Court Championships crown in a record 24-minute match against Darlene Hard, 6–1, 6–1.
Helen Wills defeated Joan Fry at the 1927 Wightman Cup 6–2, 6–0 in 24 minutes.
Helen Wills, while dispatching Emily Wright 6–0, 6–0 in Beaulieu, France in 1926, won the first set in 9 minutes.

Grand Slam tournaments

French Open
Steffi Graf won 6–0, 6–0, against Natasha Zvereva in the 1988 French Open final. The official time of the match given on the scoresheet was 34 minutes, but the match consumed just 32 minutes of playing time, split into two periods of nine and 23 minutes because of a rain break. It is the only "double bagel" Grand Slam singles final of the Open Era, and only the second time in the history of tennis (the other being at 1911 Wimbledon).

Wimbledon
During the 1969 tournament, Sue Tutt beat Marion Boundy 6–2, 6–0 in 20 minutes.
In the 1922 Wimbledon final Suzanne Lenglen defeated Molla Mallory, 6–2, 6–0, in 23 minutes. Some accounts state that the match was over in 20 minutes.
In the 1925 Wimbledon final Lenglen defeated Joan Fry in 25 minutes, 6–2, 6–0.

Fewest games

  = winner of the match also won the tournament.

Men (triple bagel)

There have been at least 17 best-of-five-set matches which have lasted 18 games (6–0, 6–0, 6–0), colloquially referred to as a "triple bagel", in the Open Era. This is the shortest possible length for a best-of-five-set match, not including retirements or defaults.

Women (double bagel)

In women's tennis, matches featuring a minimum number of games are a more frequent occurrence. The following are women's Grand Slam singles matches which have lasted 12 games (6–0, 6–0), colloquially referred to as a "double bagel", in the Open Era. This is the shortest possible length for a best-of-three-set match, not including retirements or defaults.

Women's singles

Women's doubles

See also
 Longest tennis match records
 Lists of tennis records and statistics

References

Tennis records and statistics